Karl Vorbrodt, or Carl, (1865, Wabern - 1932, Morcote) was a Swiss entomologist who specialised in Lepidoptera and microlepidoptera.
Vorbrodt published fauna studies, revisions and descriptions of new species in Mitteilungen der Schweizerischen Entomologischen Gesellschaft. Together with Johann Müller-Rutz he wrote Die Schmetterlinge der Schweiz (Butterflies of Switzerland) Bern K.J. Wyss, 1911-1914. His collection of Palearctic Lepidoptera is in the Natural History Museum of Bern.

References
Burckhardt, D. 2000: [Biographien] Entomologica Basiliensia, Basel 22, 11837, pp. 36, Portrait
Groll, E. K. 2017: Biographies of the Entomologists of the World. – Online database, version 8, Senckenberg Deutsches Entomologisches Institut, Müncheberg – URL: sdei.senckenberg.de/biografies

1932 deaths
1865 births
Swiss lepidopterists